Nicotinyl methylamide is an experimental drug with no approved indication.  It is also a metabolite of nicotinamide (vitamin B3) and is found in urine.

See also
 Niacin
 Niacinamide

References

Nicotinamides
Experimental drugs